Ebrahim Rahimian (born 29 June 1981 in Ardabil) is an Iranian racewalker. He competed in the 20 km walk at the 2012 Summer Olympics but did not finish the race. In 2013 he failed a doping test for EPO and was sanctioned or provisionally suspended by the IAAF.

References

1981 births
Living people
Iranian racewalkers
Olympic athletes of Iran
Athletes (track and field) at the 2012 Summer Olympics
People from Ardabil
Iranian sportspeople in doping cases
Doping cases in athletics
Male racewalkers
Iranian male athletes